Blake Boston, commonly known as Scumbag Steve, is the subject of an Internet meme that became popular in 2011. It originated with a 2006 picture taken by Boston's mother, Susan, of then-16-year-old Blake Boston of Millis, Massachusetts, wearing a backwards fitted cap and winter coat with a fake fur collar. The meme generally superimposes text on top of the image of Boston consisting of an introductory sentence at the top and a punchline at the bottom. In 2012, Boston released a rap single on iTunes, under the alias "Blake Boston AKA Scumbag Steve" in an attempt to launch a career in music.

References

Internet memes introduced in the 2010s
Internet memes introduced in 2011